Yu Nam-sung (born 3 October 1978) is a retired South Korean javelin thrower.

He won the 1997 Asian Junior Championships, and became South Korean champion once—in 1999—before Park Jae-Myong started a lengthy winning streak. He finished fifth at the 1998 Asian Games and twelfth at the 1999 Summer Universiade. He also competed at the 1999 World Championships without reaching the final.

His personal best time was 79.84 metres, achieved in April 1998 in Youngju.

References

1978 births
Living people
South Korean male javelin throwers
World Athletics Championships athletes for South Korea
Athletes (track and field) at the 1998 Asian Games
Asian Games competitors for South Korea